The 5th Parliament of Antigua and Barbuda was elected on Thursday, 11 February 1971 and dissolved on Saturday, 31 January 1976.

It was the only parliament with a PLM majority.

Members

Senate

House of Representatives 
Speaker: Hon. Cecil Hewlett (1971-1975), Unknown (1975-1976)

References 

Parliaments of Antigua and Barbuda